Operação Acolhida (en: Operation Welcome) is a Brazilian operation launched by the Brazilian Army in February 2018 that aims to protect Venezuelans crossing the border, providing humanitarian aid to Venezuelan immigrants in vulnerable situations, refugees from the political, institutional and socioeconomic crisis that affects the Socialist dictatorship of Venezuela under dictator Nicolás Maduro (2013 -).

It began under president Michel Temer (May 2016 - Dec. 31, 2018) and continued under president Jair Bolsonaro (Jan. 1, 2019 - Dec. 31, 2022).

References 

Humanitarian military operations
Venezuela
Roraima
Brazilian Air Force